Kampong Sungai Akar is a village in Brunei-Muara District, Brunei, as well as a neighbourhood in the capital Bandar Seri Begawan. The population was 5,467 in 2016.

Administration 
Kampong Sungai Akar is one of the villages under Mukim Berakas 'B', a mukim in Brunei-Muara District. It has the postcode BC4115.

The village has also been subsumed under the municipal area of the capital Bandar Seri Begawan.

Facilities 
The village mosque is Rashidah Sa'adatul Bolkiah Mosque and it was inaugurated by Sultan Hassanal Bolkiah on 19 July 2013. The mosque was built at a cost of around B$3.2 million (US$2.4 million as of October 2021). It can accommodate 1,000 worshippers.

Notes

References 

Villages in Brunei-Muara District
Neighbourhoods in Bandar Seri Begawan